Livestation was a platform for distributing live television and radio broadcasts over a data network. It was originally developed by Skinkers Ltd. and is now an independent company called Livestation Ltd. The service was originally based on peer-to-peer technology acquired from Microsoft Research. Between mid-June 2013 and mid-July Livestation was unavailable to some subscribers due to technical issues.

In late 2016, the service closed down without notice.

Overview
Livestation aggregated international news channels online and offered them in a number of ways:

 Free to watch: a number of channels could be watched for free on the Livestation website or on their desktop player, a freely downloadable video application that presented all the channels through one interface.
 Premium service: some of the free channels were also available on a subscription basis both in higher quality (800kbit/s) and in lower (256kbit/s) delivered via an international content distribution network for higher reliability. 
 Mobile: Livestation launched BBC World News on the iPhone in 16 European countries and Al Jazeera English globally. The apps were available in the iPhone AppStore and stream the live TV channel 24/7 on both Wi-Fi and 3G connections.

Livestation broadcast streams encoded in VC-1 format (Livestation is not currently using peer-to-peer). Playback controls were overlaid on top of the video stream. Unlike services such as Joost which offer video on demand channels, Livestation streams live broadcasts.

Livestation provided a website, mobile website and native applications for iOS, Android, Nokia and Blackberry handsets. Early models of Samsung TV were also supported. They also provided desktop software available for Windows, Mac (including PowerPC) and Linux. The cross-platform compatibility of the desktop software was facilitated by the Qt framework. Social networking features were later added that include the ability to chat with other viewers and also find out what others are watching through a user generated rating system. You could search and select the available channels either from the website, or from within the software.

In the first quarter of 2011 by 1047 percent, resulting in the first profitable quarter in its history.

Between mid-June and mid-July 2013, Livestation suffered a prolonged series of technical issues and was unavailable to some users.

In early 2015, Livestation re-branded their entire site changing what channels were offered and bringing in an interactive feature.  Some stations on the app were not on the mainsite and vice versa.

Available channels
Stations available until closure and former live TV news channels in the global offering (which comes with a default installation) included, as of 2016:

 ABS-CBN News Channel
 Al Aan TV
 Al-Alam News Network
 Al Arabiya
 Al Jazeera
 Al Jazeera English
 Al Jazeera Mubasher
 Al Mayadeen
 Al Nabaa TV
 BBC Arabic
 BBC Persian  
 BBC World News
 BBC World Service Radio
 CNBC
 CNBC Arabiya (EMEA)
 Bloomberg TV
 BBC News Channel
 CCTV News
 CNC World
 CNN International
 C-SPAN
 Democratic Voice of Burma
 Deutsche Welle TV and radio 
 eNCA
 Euronews
 Espreso TV
 Fox News Radio
 France24
 HispanTV
 i24news
 Kurdast News
 Libya TV
 NASA TV
 NHK World News
 One News
 Press TV
 RFI Afrique and Monde.
 Reuters TV
 Russia Today
 SAMAA TV
 Sky News Arabia 
 Sky News International
 TeleSUR
 United Nations Television
 UNHCR TV
 VOA Persian

As of 2016, the Livestation site is closed.

See also
 IPTV
 Internet Television
 TVUnetworks

References

External links
 Official website
 Live Station Status

Internet television streaming services
Internet properties established in 2008
Internet properties disestablished in 2016
Defunct companies based in London
Microsoft Research
Television technology